Mika Hämäläinen (born 15 March 1967) is a Finnish former cyclist. He competed at the 1988 Summer Olympics and the 1992 Summer Olympics.

References

External links
 

1967 births
Living people
Finnish male cyclists
Olympic cyclists of Finland
Cyclists at the 1988 Summer Olympics
Cyclists at the 1992 Summer Olympics
Sportspeople from Helsinki
20th-century Finnish people